Walter Gaynor Caldwell (February 19, 1886 – January 28, 1934) was an American civil engineer and politician.

Born in Pewaukee, Wisconsin. Caldwell graduated from Pewaukee High School. He then went to Marquette University and then received his bachelor's degree in civil engineering from University of Wisconsin. He worked for the Wisconsin Highway Commission. Caldwell also served as Waukesha County surveyor and county engineer. He also worked for the Waukesha, Wisconsin public works department. In 1933, Caldwell served in the Wisconsin State Assembly and was a Democrat. Caldwell died in a hospital in Madison, Wisconsin from pneumonia as a result of abdominal surgery.

Notes

1886 births
1934 deaths
People from Pewaukee, Wisconsin
Marquette University alumni
American civil engineers
County officials in Wisconsin
University of Wisconsin–Madison College of Engineering alumni
20th-century American politicians
Democratic Party members of the Wisconsin State Assembly